The North Carolina Award is the highest civilian award bestowed by the U.S. state of North Carolina. It is awarded in the four fields of science, literature, the fine arts, and public service. Sometimes referred to as the "Nobel Prize of North Carolina", the award has been given to up to nine individuals each year since 1964. The awards, provided for by chapters 140A and 143B of the North Carolina General Statutes, are chosen by the North Carolina Awards Committee appointed by the Governor of North Carolina and supervised by the North Carolina Department of Natural and Cultural Resources.

The award was designed by sculptor Paul Manship and was one of the last commissions he completed before his death.

History of the award

The award was proposed by state Senator Robert Lee Humber of Pitt County, who wanted to recognize people who had contributed to the betterment of North Carolina and inspire others. He won the award for public service in 1968.

Biographical essays are available for each North Carolina Award recipient in the ceremony program for that year. Ceremony programs are online through the North Carolina Digital Collections.

Award winners

1960s
1964
 Literature: Inglis Fletcher
 Science: John Couch
 Fine Arts: Francis Speight
 Public Service: John Morehead, Clarence Poe
1965
 Literature: Paul Green, Gerald Johnson
 Science: Frederick A. Wolf
 Fine Arts: Hunter Johnson
 Public Service: Frank Porter Graham
1966
 Literature: Bernice Kelly Harris
 Science: Oscar Rice
 Fine Arts: Arthur G. Odell Jr.
 Public Service: Luther Hodges
1967
 Literature: Jonathan Worth Daniels
 Science: Carl W. Gottschalk, H. Houston Merritt
 Fine Arts: Benjamin F. Swalin
 Public Service: Albert Coates
1968
 Literature: Vermont C. Royster, Charles Russell
 Science: Stanley Stephens
 Fine Arts: Hobson Pittman
 Public Service: Robert Lee Humber
1969
 Literature: Ovid Pierce,
 Science: Kenneth Brinkhous
 Fine Arts: Charles Stanford, Jr.
 Public Service: May G. L. Kellenberger

1970s
1970
 Literature: Frances Gray Patton
 Science: Philip Handler
 Fine Arts: Henry C. Pearson
 Public Service: Terry Sanford
1971
 Literature: Guy Owen Novelist
 Science: no award
 Fine Arts: James Semans & Mary Semans
 Public Service: Capus Waynick, James E. Webb
1972
 Literature: John Ehle
 Science: Edward David, Jr., Harold Hotelling
 Fine Arts: Sidney Blackmer
 Public Service: William Dallas Herring
1973
 Literature: Helen Smith Bevington, Burke Davis
 Science: Ellis Cowling
 Fine Arts: Kenneth Ness
 Public Service: Samuel J. Ervin
1974
 Literature: Thad Stem, Jr.
 Science: James Wyngaarden
 Fine Arts: William Fields
 Public Service: Ellen Black Winston
1975
 Literature: Doris Betts
 Science: John Etchells
 Fine Arts: Robert Ward (composer)
 Public Service: William Friday
1976
 Literature: Richard Walser
 Science: C. Clark Cockerham
 Fine Arts: Romare Bearden, Foster Fitz-Simons
 Public Service: Juanita Kreps
1977
 Literature: Reynolds Price
 Science: Reginald Mitchiner
 Fine Arts: Joseph Sloane, Jonathan Williams
 Public Service: Elizabeth Duncan Koontz
1978
 Literature: Manly Wade Wellman
 Science: David Sabiston, Jr.
 Fine Arts: Henry Kamphoefner
 Public Service: Robert Garvey, Jr., Harriet Tynes
1979
 Literature: Harry Golden
 Science: Walter Gordy
 Fine Arts: Sam Ragan
 Public Service: Archie Davis, John deButts

1980s
1980
 Literature: Fred Chappell
 Science: George Hitchings
 Fine Arts: Robert Lindgren (dancer)
 Public Service: Dan Moore, Jeanelle Moore
1981
 Literature: Glen Rounds, Tom Wicker
 Science: Vivian Stannett
 Fine Arts: Adeline McCall
 Public Service: Ralph Scott
1982
 Literature: Willie Snow Ethridge
 Science: Floyd Denny, Jr.
 Fine Arts: Selma Burke, R. Philip Hanes, Jr.
 Public Service: Nancy Chase
1983
 Literature: Heather Ross Miller
 Science: Frank Guthrie
 Fine Arts: Mary Keesler Dalton & Harry Lee Dalton
 Public Service: Hugh Morton
1984
 Literature: Joseph Mitchell, Lee Smith
 Science: Robert Hill
 Fine Arts: Maud Gatewood, Andy Griffith
 Public Service: George Watts Hill
1985
 Literature: Wilma Dykeman
 Science: Irwin Fridovich
 Fine Arts: Claude Howell
 Public Service: J. Gordon Hanes, Jr.
1986
 Literature: A.R. Ammons
 Science: Ernest Eliel
 Fine Arts: Doc Watson
 Public Service: Joseph M. Bryan, Billy Graham Emmett McRae
1987
 Literature: Maya Angelou
 Science: Robert Lefkowitz
 Fine Arts: Harvey Littleton
 Public Service: John T. Caldwell, Charles Kuralt
1988
 Literature: Charles Eaton
 Science: Pedro Cuatrecasas
 Fine Arts: Edith London
 Public Service: David Brinkley, William Lee
1989
 Literature: Ronald Bayes
 Science: Gertrude Elion
 Fine Arts: Loonis McGlohon
 Public Service: Roy Park, Maxine Swalin

1990s
1990
 Literature: Leon Rooke
 Science: H. Keith H. Brodie
 Fine Arts: Bob Timberlake
 Public Service: Dean Colvard, Frank Kenan
1991
 Literature: Robert Morgan
 Science: Mary Ellen Jones
 Fine Arts: William Brown
 Public Service: Elizabeth Dole, Jesse Meredith
1992
 Literature: Louis D. Rubin, Jr.
 Science: John Madey
 Fine Arts: Chuck Davis (dancer)
 Public Service: William McWhorter Cochrane, Maxwell Thurman
1993
 Literature: John Hope Franklin
 Science: Oliver Smithies
 Fine Arts: Joe Cox, Billy Taylor
 Public Service: Eric Schopler
1994
 Literature: Elizabeth Spencer
 Science: Marshall Edgell
 Fine Arts: Sarah Blakeslee
 Public Service: Richard Jenrette, Freda Nicholson
1995
 Literature: James Applewhite
 Science: Clyde A. Hutchison, III, John Mayo
 Fine Arts: John Biggers, Kenneth Noland
 Public Service: Banks Talley, Jr.
1996
 Literature: Betty Adcock
 Science: Joseph Pagano
 Fine Arts: Joanne Bath
 Public Service: Martha McKay, John L. Sanders, Robert Scott
1997
 Literature: Clyde Edgerton
 Science: Robert Bruck
 Fine Arts: M. Mellanay Delhom
 Public Service: Thomas Kenan, III, Elna Spaulding
1998
 Literature: Kaye Gibbons
 Science: Martin Rodbell
 Fine Arts: Robert Gray, Marvin Saltzman, James Taylor
 Public Service: Emily Harris Preyer, L. Richardson Preyer
1999
 Literature: Allan Gurganus, Jill McCorkle
 Science: Robert Parr, Knut Schmidt-Nielsen
 Fine Arts: Frank L. Horton, Herb Jackson
 Public Service: Julia Jones Daniels, Frank Daniels, Jr., Henry Shelton

2000s
2000
 Literature: William S. Powell
 Science: William Fletcher
 Fine Arts: S. Tucker Cooke
 Public Service: Henry Bowers, Harlan E. Boyles, James Goodmon
2001
 Literature: Kathryn Stripling Byer, Shelby Stephenson
 Science: Royce W. Murray
 Fine Arts: Arthur Smith
 Public Service: W.W. Finlator, Robert Jordan, III
2002
 Literature: Romulus Linney
 Science: William Anlyan
 Fine Arts: Cynthia Bringle, Martha Nell Hardy
 Public Service: Julius L. Chambers, H. G. Jones, Edwin Wilson
2003
 Literature: Jaki Shelton Green
 Science: William E. Thornton
 Fine Arts: Etta Baker, Mary Ann Scherr
 Public Service: Frank Borden Hanes, James B. Hunt, Jr.
2004
 Literature: Walter J. Harrelson, Penelope Niven
 Science: Annie Louise Wilkerson
 Fine Arts: William Ivey Long, Elizabeth Matheson
 Public Service: Voit Gilmore, LeRoy T. Walker
2005
 Literature: Randall Kenan
 Science: Mansukh C. Wani
 Fine Arts: Bland Simpson
 Public Service: Joseph M. Bryan, Jr., Betty Debnam Hunt, Thomas Willis Lambeth
2006
 Literature: Emily Herring Wilson, Michael F. Parker
 Science: Charles A. Sanders
 Fine Arts: William T. Williams
 Public Service: Roy Park, Jr., James E. Holshouser, Jr., Thomas K. Hearn, Jr.
2007
 Literature: William Leuchtenburg
 Science: Viney Aneja, Darrel Stafford
 Fine Arts: Jan Davidson, Rosemary Harris
 Public Service: Jerry C. Cashion, Henry Frye, Burley Mitchell, Charlie Rose
2008
 Literature: Charles Frazier, Margaret Maron
 Science: Maurice Brookhart
 Fine Arts: Gerald Freedman, Alexander M. Rivera Jr.
 Public Service: Ann Goodnight, James G. Martin, Dean Smith, Fred and Alice Stanback
2009
 Literature: Gerald Barrax
 Science: Joseph M. DeSimone
 Fine Arts: Mark Peiser, Bo Thorp
 Public Service: Betty Ray McCain, Hugh L. McColl, Jr.

2010s
2010
 Literature: Carole Boston Weatherford
 Science: F. Ivy Carroll
 Fine Arts: Robert Ebendorf, Donald Sultan
 Public Service: R. Michael Leonard, Margaret S. "Tog" Newman
2011
 Literature: Ron Rash
 Science: Trudy Mackay
 Fine Arts: Branford Marsalis, Vollis Simpson
 Public Service: Charles E. Hammer, Jr., H. Martin Lancaster
2012
 Literature: Gary Neil Carden
 Science: B. Jayant Baliga
 Fine Arts: Lou Donaldson, Thomas H. Sayre
 Public Service: Bonnie McElveen-Hunter, Janice H. Faulkner
2013
 Literature: John Hart (author)
 Science: Myron S. Cohen
 Fine Arts: John Cram
 Public Service: Phil Kirk, John Harding Lucas, Walt Wolfram
2014
 Literature: Lenard Moore, Alan Shapiro
 Science: Jagdish Narayan
 Fine Arts: Ira David Wood III
 Public Service: Betsy M. Bennett, Robert A. Ingram
2015
 Literature: Anthony S. Abbott
 Science: Anthony Atala
 Fine Arts: A. Everette James, Patricia McBride
 Public Service: James T. Broyhill, Howard N. Lee
2016
 Literature: Joseph Bathanti
 Science: Linda Birnbaum, Aziz Sancar, Paul L. Modrich
 Fine Arts: Assad Meymandi
 Public Service: Robert J. Brown (businessman), Jim Gardner (politician)
2017
 Literature: Margaret Donovan Bauer
 Science: R.K.M. Jayanty
 Fine Arts: Philip Freelon
 Public Service: Loretta E. Lynch, Jane Smith Patterson, James H. Woodward
2018
 Literature: Michael McFee
 Fine Arts: Bill Leslie, Barbara B. Millhouse
 Public Service: Carolyn Q. Coleman, William L. Roper, Gene Roberts
2019
 Literature: Philip Gerard
 Fine Arts: Lawrence J. Wheeler
 Public Service: Deborah S. Proctor
 Science: Catherine M. Wilfert, M.D.

2020s
2020
 Science: Ralph S. Baric, Francis S. Collins, Kizzmekia S. Corbett

2021
 Fine Arts: David Holt
 Literature: André Leon Talley, Timothy B. Tyson
 Public Service: Dudley E. Flood, Maria F. Spaulding
 Science: Blake S. Wilson

See also 
 Order of the Long Leaf Pine

References

External links
NC Awards page at the NC Dept of Cultural Resources
NC Awards page at the NCpedia

Awards established in 1964
1964 establishments in North Carolina
Government of North Carolina
North Carolina culture
State awards and decorations of the United States
Works by Paul Manship